Alleppey Ashraf is an Indian film director, producer and distributor working mainly in Malayalam cinema. He started his career as an impressionist and later a dubbing artist. He is considered as an inspiration for many in mimicry art. He has also directed several films even though he was never a busy director.

Filmography

Director
His filmography includes:

Producer
Minda Poochakku Kalyanam
Www.anukudumbam.com
The Truth (1998 film)

Dialogue writer
Oru Madapravinte Katha 
Mukhya Manthri
Paara
Oru Muthassikkadha
Minda Poochakku Kalyanam
Ennum Sambhavaami Yuge Yuge

Story writer
Oru Madapravinte Katha 
Mukhya Manthri
Paara
Minda Poochakku Kalyanam
Ennum Sambhavaami Yuge Yuge

Screenplay writer
Oru Madapravinte Katha 
Mukhya Manthri
Paara
Ennum Sambhavaami Yuge Yuge

Actor
Honey Bee 2.5 (2017) as Himself
Honey Bee 2 Celebrations (2017) as Capt. Francis
Kavi Uddheshichathu..? (2016) as Binukuttan
Avarude Veedu
Ithu Manthramo Thanthramo Kuthanthramo (2013)
Paattinte Palazhy (2010)
Changathippocha (2007)
Mahasamudram (2006) as Doctor
Aparanmaar Nagarathi (2001) as Doctor
Jananayakan (1999)
Devadasi (1999)
Aaraam Thampuran (1997) as Jayaraman
Guru (1997)
Bhaaratheeyam (1997) 
Nirnnayam (1995)
Aakasha Kottayile Sultan (1991)
Ee Kanni Koodi (1990)
Ramji Rao Speaking (1989) as Chemmeen Varghese
Ethirppukal (1984) as Raghu's uncle
Vanitha Police (1984) as Director Keshavan
Arikkari Ammu (1981)
Attimari (1981)
Prema Geethangal (1981)
Kilinjalgal (TAMIL) (1981)
Aniyatha Valakkal (1980)
Theekkadal (1980)
Dweepu (1977)

TV Serial
 Kanalppoovu (Kairali TV)

Dubbing career

Production
 Oru Muthassi Katha
 In Harihar Nagar

External links

References

20th-century Indian male actors
Malayalam film directors
Living people
Film directors from Kerala
Year of birth missing (living people)
Male actors from Alappuzha
20th-century Indian film directors